Timothy Trudeau Smart (born 10 July 1972) is an Australian-born Hong Kong cricketer.

Smart is an aggressive right-handed batsman and wicket-keeper and has played cricket in Hong Kong for a number of years. He made his One Day International debut for his adopted nation in the 2004 Asia Cup against Bangladesh.

Smart made his first-class debut in 2005.

External links

Howstat profile for Tim Smart

1972 births
Living people
Hong Kong cricketers
Hong Kong One Day International cricketers
Hong Kong people of Australian descent
Hong Kong cricket captains
Wicket-keepers